Ďurkov is a village and municipality in Košice-okolie District in the Košice Region of eastern Slovakia.

History
In historical records the village was first mentioned in 1272.

Geography
The village lies at an altitude of 261 metres and covers an area of 9.921 km².
It has a population of 1560 people.

Ethnicity
The population is 99% Slovak in ethnicity.

Government
The village relies on the Bohdanovce police force and the fire brigade at Bidovce. The district and tax offices are located at Košice.

Culture
The village has a small public library.

Transport
The nearest railway station is located at Ruskov, 5 kilometres away and there is bus from Košice arriving during all day and also there is small airport in Bidovce 4 km away.

Genealogical resources

The records for genealogical research are available at the state archive "Statny Archiv in Kosice, Slovakia"

 Roman Catholic church records (births/marriages/deaths): 1789-1918 (parish B)
 Greek Catholic church records (births/marriages/deaths): 1788-1912 (parish B)
 Lutheran church records (births/marriages/deaths): 1776-1898 (parish B)
 Reformated church records (births/marriages/deaths): 1801-1952 (parish A)

See also
 List of municipalities and towns in Slovakia

External links
Surnames of living people in Durkov

Villages and municipalities in Košice-okolie District
Šariš